As of November 12th 2017, the Sun Youth Hornets are the QBFL Champions

Teams (2010 season) 
Bill Allan Division

North Shore Lions
St. Lazare Stallions
St. Laurent Spartans
Laurentian Wildcats
Lasalle Warriors
Sun Youth Hornets

Earl De La Perralle Division
Ile-Perrot Western Patriots
Lakeshore Cougars
Joliette Pirates
Chateaugay Raiders
North Shore Cheetahs 
St. Leonard Cougars

Bob Mironowicz Division

Sherbrooke Bulldogs
Laurentien Jaguars
Laurentien Lions
Laurentien Pantheres
Laurentien Lynx
Laurentien Pumas

External links 
Quebec Bantam Football League Official Site
The Official À-Ma-Baie Website

Canadian football leagues in Quebec